Sugunapuram Palanisamy Velumani, born 10 May 1969, is an Indian politician and current Member of the Tamil Nadu Legislative Assembly from Thondamuthur state assembly constituency. He is a prominent politician of All India Anna Dravida Munnetra Kazhagam. He has won the Tamil Nadu Legislative Assembly elections in 2006, 2011,  2016 & 2021 as an All India Anna Dravida Munnetra Kazhagam candidate. He was previously the Minister for Municipal Administration, Rural Development, Law and Implementation of Special Programme.
He is currently serving as the Headquarters Secretary, of All India Anna Dravida Munnetra Kazhagam from 13 July 2022.

Personal life
S. P. Velumani, was born on May 10, 1969, in Sugunapuram, Kuniyamuthur, Coimbatore district, to E.A. Palanisamy and Mayilathal. S. P. Velumani holds an M.A. degree and an M. Phil. from Annamalai University.

Political career
He served as Kuniyamuthur Municipal Chairman. He won the 2006 Tamil Nadu state legislature elections from Perur constituency as an AIADMK candidate. He registered marginal victories in the 2011 and 2016 elections from the newly formed constituency of Thondamuthur.

He was given his first ministerial portfolio in 2011 when he was made the Minister for Municipal Administration, Rural Development, and Law. 

The directorate of Vigilance and Anti-Corruption (DVAC) booked a criminal case against Velumani and his associates in connection with a scam of Rs 500 crore in the purchase of LED street lights for rural area development between 2015 and 2018.

Party posts

Member of the Legislative Assembly

References

External links
 

All India Anna Dravida Munnetra Kazhagam politicians
People from Coimbatore district
Living people
1969 births
Tamil Nadu MLAs 2006–2011
Tamil Nadu MLAs 2011–2016
Tamil Nadu MLAs 2016–2021
Tamil Nadu MLAs 2021–2026